This is a summary of 1939 in music in the United Kingdom.

Events
April – a left-wing Festival of Music for the People is held in London. Participants include a pageant for 500 singers and 100 dancers featuring the American singer Paul Robeson as soloist, a balalaika orchestra playing Russian tunes, music by Alan Bush, and Benjamin Britten's Ballad of Heroes with words by W.H. Auden and Randall Swingler, performed by "Twelve Co-operative and Labour Choirs". John Ireland's These Things Shall Be is performed at the festival's third concert in the Queen's Hall conducted by Constant Lambert.
29 April – Benjamin Britten and Peter Pears leave the UK for North America on board the SS Ausonia.
 10 May – Heimo Haitto, 13, wins the British Council music prize
10 June – the New York Philharmonic, conducted by Sir Adrian Boult, gives the first public performance of Arthur Bliss's Piano Concerto in B flat with soloist Solomon; Arnold Bax's Symphony No. 7; and Ralph Vaughan Williams' Five Variants of Dives and Lazarus, in a concert held at Carnegie Hall.
7 December – William Walton's Violin Concerto is given its première in Cleveland, Ohio, United States, by Jascha Heifetz, for whom it was written.
The Nordstrom Sisters are the resident act at the Ritz Hotel in London.
The National Gallery, with all its pictures taken to a secure location at the outbreak of war, becomes home of popular lunchtime concerts organised by pianist Myra Hess, assisted by the composer Howard Ferguson and with the enthusiastic backing of the gallery's director Sir Kenneth Clark.

Popular music
 "Imagine Me in the Maginot Line" w.m. Harry Gifford & Frederick E. Cliffe
"Kiss Me Goodnight, Sergeant Major" Art Noel, Don Pelosi.
 "On The Outside Always Lookin' In" w.m. Michael Carr 
 "Somewhere In France With You" w.m. Michael Carr
 "South Of The Border" w.m. Jimmy Kennedy & Michael Carr
 "We'll Meet Again" w. Hughie Charles m. Ross Parker
"We're Going to Hang out the Washing on the Siegfried Line" w.m. Jimmy Kennedy & Michael Carr
 "There'll Always Be an England" w.m. Ross Parker & Hughie Charles
 "Wish Me Luck as You Wave Me Goodbye" by Harry Parr Davies, performed by Gracie Fields

Classical music: new works
Arnold Bax – Pastoral Fantasia for Viola and String Orchestra
Arthur Bliss – Piano Concerto in B flat
Benjamin Britten –
Les Illuminations
Violin Concerto
Herbert Howells – Concerto for Strings
William Lloyd Webber
Lento in E major for string orchestra
Waltz in E minor for orchestra
William Walton – Violin Concerto

Film and Incidental music
Richard Addinsell (orch. Roy Douglas) – 
Goodbye, Mr Chips.
The Lion Has Wings, starring Merle Oberon and Ralph Richardson.
Eric Fenby – Jamaica Inn directed by Alfred Hitchcock, starring Charles Laughton and Maureen O'Hara.
Ernest Irving – Come On George!, starring George Formby, Patricia Kirkwood and Joss Ambler.

Musical theatre
 20 January – Magyar Melody London production opened at His Majesty's Theatre and ran for 105 performances
23 March – The Dancing Years London production opened at the Drury Lane Theatre and ran for 187 performances
21 April The Little Revue London revue opened at The Little Theatre and ran for 415 performances
3 November – Runaway Love opened at the Saville Theatre on November 3 and ran for 195 performances
14 November – Black Velvet London revue opened at the Hippodrome Theatre and ran for 620 performances
21 December – Shephard's Pie London revue opened at the Princes Theatre on December 21
22 December Haw-Haw (Music: Harry Parr Davies Words: Phil Park Script: Max Miller & Ben Lyon) opened at the Holborn Empire.  Starring Bebe Daniels, Ben Lyon and Max Miller.

Musical filmsDiscoveries – introduced the song "There'll Always Be an England".The Mikado, starring Martyn Green as Ko-Ko, Sydney Granville as Pooh-Bah, Kenny Baker as Nanki-Poo, and Jean Colin as Yum-Yum.Yes, Madam?, starring Bobby Howes, Diana Churchill and Wylie Watson.

Births
8 March – Robert Tear, tenor (died 2011)
16 April – Dusty Springfield, singer (died 1999)
3 May – Jonathan Harvey, composer (died 2012)
6 July – Jet Harris, British bassist, singer and songwriter (The Shadows) (died 2011)
17 July – Spencer Davis, singer-songwriter and guitarist (The Spencer Davis Group)
18 July – Brian Auger, English keyboard player (Brian Auger and the Trinity, CAB, and The Steampacket)
19 August – Ginger Baker, drummer
30 August – John Peel, influential disc jockey (died 2004)
10 September – Cynthia Lennon, writer, first wife of English musician (Beatle) John Lennon (died 2015)
8 December – Sir James Galway, flautist
13 December – Eric Flynn, British actor and singer (died 2002)

Deaths
January – Leonard N. Fowles, organist, conductor and composer, 68 
25 January – Charles Davidson Dunbar, soldier and bagpipe player, 68
8 March – Gertrude Eaton, singer, 78
25 April – John Foulds, composer, 58 (cholera)
20 July – Sir Dan Godfrey, conductor, 71
27 October – Nelly Bromley, singer and actress, 89
9 November – Charles Goulding, operatic tenor
19 December – Eric Fogg, composer and conductor, 36 (killed by train)date unknown'' – Colin Wark, film composer

See also
 1939 in British television
 1939 in the United Kingdom
 List of British films of 1939

References

British Music, 1939 in
Music
British music by year
1930s in British music